In enzymology, a 5,6-dihydroxy-3-methyl-2-oxo-1,2,5,6-tetrahydroquinoline dehydrogenase is an enzyme that catalyzes the chemical reaction

5,6-dihydroxy-3-methyl-2-oxo-1,2,5,6-tetrahydroquinoline + NAD+  5,6-dihydroxy-3-methyl-2-oxo-1,2-dihydroquinoline + NADH + H+

Thus, the two substrates of this enzyme are 5,6-dihydroxy-3-methyl-2-oxo-1,2,5,6-tetrahydroquinoline and NAD+, whereas its 3 products are 5,6-dihydroxy-3-methyl-2-oxo-1,2-dihydroquinoline, NADH, and H+.

This enzyme belongs to the family of oxidoreductases, specifically those acting on the CH-CH group of donor with NAD+ or NADP+ as acceptor.  The systematic name of this enzyme class is 5,6-dihydroxy-3-methyl-2-oxo-1,2,5,6-tetrahydroquinoline:NAD+ oxidoreductase.

References

 

EC 1.3.1
NADH-dependent enzymes
Enzymes of unknown structure